The Battle Mountain Formation is a geologic formation in Colorado. It preserves fossils dating back to the Carboniferous period.

See also

 List of fossiliferous stratigraphic units in Colorado
 Paleontology in Colorado

References
 

Carboniferous Colorado